Ethan Haas can refer to:

A character on the TV show Masters of Sex
A character on the TV show The Class
A character related to an alternate reality game entitled Ethan Haas Was Right